Club Baloncesto Salamanca was a professional basketball club based in Salamanca, Spain.

History
CB Salamanca was founded in 1993 after buying the spot in 1ª División (Spanish second league) to Askatuak SBT. On its first year, the team promoted to Liga ACB as runner-up of the league.

Salamanca played two season in Liga ACB. In the first one, 1994–95, the team finished in the 16th position and in the second one was 9th and qualified to play the Korać Cup. Due to financial problems, in summer 1996 CB Salamanca sold its berths of Liga ACB and Korać Cup to CB Granada and the team was dissolved.

Season by season

Notable players
 Rafael Vecina
 Federico Ramiro
 Kenny Atkinson
 Granger Hall
 Perry Carter
 Jimmy Oliver
 Jeff Sanders
 Jeff Martin

External links
Salamanca: sueño fugaz ACB.com

Defunct basketball teams in Spain
Basketball teams in Castile and León
Former Liga ACB teams
Basketball teams established in 1993
Basketball teams disestablished in 1996
Sport in Salamanca